The Seychelles Movement for Democracy was a political party in Seychelles. It was active in the early 1990s. Its leader was Jacques Hodoul.

Political parties in Seychelles
Main

The party won 0.77% of the vote for representation of delegates in the constitutional commission of 1992.

References